Zhu Mingye (born 14 January 1992) is a Chinese épée fencer.

She participated at the 2019 World Fencing Championships, winning a medal.

References

External links

1992 births
Living people
Fencers from Guangdong
Chinese female fencers
Chinese épée fencers
World Fencing Championships medalists
Asian Games medalists in fencing
Asian Games gold medalists for China
Fencers at the 2018 Asian Games
Medalists at the 2018 Asian Games
Fencers at the 2020 Summer Olympics
Olympic fencers of China
21st-century Chinese women